Lois Rayma McIvor (22 October 1930 – 11 June 2017) was a New Zealand artist.

Career 
McIvor studied at the Elam School of Fine Arts, Auckland, and later under the tutelage of Colin McCahon.

She was predominantly a landscape painter, often using glowing pastel colours and her landscapes were inspired by Manukau Harbour and Titirangi, where she lived for many years.

McIvor was one of the founding members of the Association of Women Artists.

Paintings by McIvor are held in public and private collections throughout the world, including the Remuera Gallery.

Exhibitions 
Notable exhibitions by McIvor include:
 with The Group in 1962 and 1968
 a retrospective exhibition of her work from 1956 to 2001 held in 2001 at Northart
 Making the World Look New, in 2013 at the Remuera Gallery

References

Further reading 
Artist files for McIvor are held at:
 Angela Morton Collection, Takapuna Library
 E. H. McCormick Research Library, Auckland Art Gallery Toi o Tāmaki
 Robert and Barbara Stewart Library and Archives, Christchurch Art Gallery Te Puna o Waiwhetu
 Fine Arts Library, University of Auckland
 Hocken Collections Uare Taoka o Hākena
 Te Aka Matua Research Library, Museum of New Zealand Te Papa Tongarewa
 Macmillan Brown Library, University of Canterbury
Also see:
 Concise Dictionary of New Zealand Artists McGahey, Kate (2000) Gilt Edge

1930 births
2017 deaths
New Zealand painters
New Zealand women painters
Landscape painters
University of Auckland alumni
Elam Art School alumni
People associated with The Group (New Zealand art)
Artists from Auckland